Patricia Donahue (March 6, 1925 – June 11, 2012) was an actress who performed in television and films from 1956 to 1984.

Career
Donahue portrayed Lucy Hamilton, secretary to the title character in the Michael Shayne TV series. She also appeared in such television series as Death Valley Days, Goodyear Theatre, The Californians, The Walter Winchell File, Tales of Wells Fargo, The Thin Man, The Millionaire, Mr. Adams and Eve, The Twilight Zone, General Electric Theater, Perry Mason, Peter Gunn, 77 Sunset Strip, Bat Masterson, Mr. Lucky, Bonanza, The Wide World of Mystery, Thriller, Danger Man,(AKA Secret Agent Man in USA)  the saint (episode : The Charitable Countess), Alfred Hitchcock present (dear uncle George), and dozens of other programs. Her film credits include The Fastest Guitar Alive, A Boy Ten Feet Tall, In the Money, Paper Tiger, Cutter's Way, and others.

For five years up to August 1966, Donahue pursued an acting career in England before her return to Hollywood, when she was shortly after cast in a "top role" in the film The Fastest Guitar Alive.

Personal life
Donahue was born in New York City and studied drama in the city while doing modelling work. Her father, Thomas Mahar, was a vaudeville performer. She was married to jazz saxophonist Sam Donahue and to film producer Euan Lloyd. She is the mother of film composer Marc Donahue and guitarist-composer and Fairport Convention member Jerry Donahue.

References

External links 

 

1925 births
2012 deaths
21st-century American actresses
American television actresses
American film actresses